The Citizenship (Amendment) Act, 2003 was passed by the Parliament of India in December 2003, and received presidential assent in January 2004. It is labelled "Act 6 of 2004".

The Act amended The Citizenship Act, 1955 by:
 introducing and defining a notion of "illegal migrant", who could be jailed or deported.
 making illegal immigrants ineligible for citizenship by registration or by naturalisation,
 disallowing citizenship by birth for children born in India if either parent is an illegal immigrant, and
 introducing a notion of Overseas Citizen of India (OCI) for citizens of other countries who are of Indian origin.
The Act also mandated the Government of India to construct and maintain a National Register of Citizens.

Scholar Anupama Roy described this amendment as a "hinge point" from which emerged the two contradictory tendencies represented by the Citizenship Amendment Bill 2016 (eventually to be an Act in 2019) and the National Register of Citizens. These two developments gave  rise to large-scale protests all over India in December 2019.

Background
The Indian Constitution was implemented in 1950 guaranteed citizenship to all of the country's residents at the commencement of the constitution, and made no distinction on the basis of religion. The Indian government passed the Citizenship Act in 1955. The Act provided two means for foreigners to acquire Indian citizenship. People from "undivided India" were given a means of registration after five years of residency in India. Those from other countries were given a means of naturalisation after ten years of residency in India.

A very large number of illegal immigrants, the largest numbers of whom are from Bangladesh, live in India. The Task Force on Border Management quoted the figure of 15 million illegal migrants in 2001. The majority of them live in the states of Assam and West Bengal, but many attempt to find work in big cities like Delhi. The reasons for the scale of migration include a porous border, historical migration patterns, economic reasons, and cultural and linguistic ties.

On August 15, 1985, after six years of violent protests against migrants and refugees in the northeastern states of India, the Assam Accord was signed between the Indian government and the leaders of the Assam movement in the presence of Rajiv Gandhi. This accord, amongst other things, promised that the Indian government will deport all illegal aliens who had arrived after March 1971. A 1986 amendment to the Citizenship Act of 1955 was proposed and passed by a Congress-led government. This amendment restricted the Indian citizenship to those born in India prior to 1987 to either a mother or a father who was an Indian citizen. The Citizenship (Amendment) Act of 1986 effectively blocked jus soli citizenship to the children of couples who were both illegal aliens and to second-generation refugees from citizenship rights in India.

In addition, in 1983, the Congress government passed the Illegal Migrants (Determination by Tribunals) Act, thereby establishing a system to detect and expel foreigners through tribunal proceedings.

The "detection, deletion and deportation" of illegal migrants has been on the agenda of the Hindu nationalist Bharatiya Janata Party (BJP) since 1996. After coming to power in 1998, the government drafted an amendment to the Foreigners Act, 1946 proposing jail sentences and fines for illegal immigrants as well as for those abetting illegal immigration. After receiving a review report from the Law Commission, the bill was passed by Rajya Sabha in May 2003 and by Lok Sabha in January 2004.

Legislative history 

The bill was introduced in the Parliament by L. K. Advani, the Home Minister, on 7 May 2003 during its Budget session. It was sent to the parliamentary standing committee on home affairs, and came back to both the houses of the Parliament towards December 2003. It was passed unanimously by Rajya Sabha on 18 December and passed "without any acrimony" in the Lok Sabha on 22 December. The Congress, AIADMK, Rashtriya Janata Dal and some other opposition parties supported the bill.

The bill was branded as a "dual citizenship bill", a reference to the provision for Overseas Citizen of India. All the other changes to the citizenship law, some of the most radical ones since 1955, were passed without any comment. More than a decade later, in 2019, a comment made by Manmohan Singh, the leader of opposition in the Rajya Sabha, got circulated. Singh said, in connection with the legislation of "illegal immigrants", that the minorities of Bangladesh who had faced persecution in the country had to be treated more liberally:

The deputy chairman of the Rajya Sabha, Najma Heptullah added that minorities in Pakistan also faced persecution. The Home minister L. K. Advani endorsed the view and made a distinction between an "illegal immigrant" and a "bona fide refugee":

But no changes in the bill are visible to address these concerns.

The Amendments

Illegal migrants 
Illegal migrants: The first significant change introduced by the 2003 Amendment is the introduction of the term "illegal migrant" to the Citizenship Act:

The concept of "illegal migrants" was used for amending all the sections of citizenship acquisition (by birth, by descent, by registration and by naturalisation).

Citizenship by birth: The section 3 of the principal Act (citizenship by birth) was replaced wholesale:

The newly added clause (c) declares that, after 2003, if either parent of a child born in India is an illegal migrant, the child is not qualified to be a citizen. For children born between 1987–2003, it was adequate for one parent to be an Indian citizen. Prior to 1987, there were no restrictions.

Citizenship by descent: The section 4 of the principal Act (citizenship by descent) had its subsection (1) replaced wholesale:

The amended section liberalised descent via father to descent via either parent.

Citizenship by registration: The section of the principal Act (citizenship by registration, meant for "persons of Indian origin", i.e., migrants from "undivided India") had its subsection (1) replaced wholesale:

By the main amendment to section 5, illegal migrants cannot acquire citizenship by registration. The residence requirement for citizenship by registration was also increased to seven years from five years. The clauses (f) and (g) added new provisions.

Citizenship by naturalisation: Section 6 (citizenship by naturalisation) was amended prohibiting illegal migrants from getting naturalised:

The Third Schedule, which lists the requirements for naturalisation, was amended by increasing the residency requirement to 12 years from the earlier 10 years.

National register of citizens 
The 2003 Amendment mandated the Central Government to create and maintain a National Register of Citizens and to issue national identity cards to all the registered citizens.

Overseas citizens

Aftermath 
In January 2005, it was reported that the Odisha government headed by Naveen Patnaik targeted 1,551 people in the Mahakalpada block for deportation, calling them illegal Bangladeshis. All of them were Hindus, and included women and children. Even though it was known that the majority of illegal immigrants in the area were Muslims, it was said that the Biju Janata Dal government was reluctant to target them.
The targeted persons, belonging to the Namasudra Matua community, protested these actions over the next 15 years, including hunger strikes in Delhi and Kolkata, and filing a Supreme Court petition demanding unconditional citizenship.

The Estimates Committee of the Indian Parliament estimated 5.2 million refugees from the present day Bangladesh in 1989, 70 percent of whom belonged to agricultural communities and were mostly from scheduled castes. This population is likely to have grown to 13 million by 2019. Scholar Himadri Chatterjee states:

In 2012, the CPI(M) leader Prakash Karat wrote Manmohan Singh, then prime minister, reminding him of his 2003 statement and urging him to bring an amendment to address the minority community refugees. The chief minister of Assam Tarun Gogoi also submitted a memorandum to the prime minister pleading that "Indian citizens" who had to flee religious persecution due to partition should not be treated as foreigners.

In September 2015, the Narandra Modi government made a decision to exempt the minority refugees of Bangladesh and Pakistan who entered India before December 2014 from the category of "illegal immigrants" and made them eligible for long-term visas. The Foreigners (Amendment) Order, 2015 was issued under the Foreigners Act, 1946 for this purpose.

In 2016, the Home minister Rajnath Singh brought a bill to the Parliament seeking exemption for persons belonging "minority communities, that is, Hindus, Jains, Sikhs, Buddhists, Parsis, and Christians" fleeing Afghanistan, Pakistan and Bangladesh due to religious persecuting from being treated as "illegal immigrants". After considerable debate, a revised version of the bill was passed as the Citizenship (Amendment) Act, 2019 and led to large-scale protests across India in 2019.

See also
 Citizenship (Amendment) Act, 2019
 National Register of Citizens
 Illegal immigration to India
 Refugees in India

Notes

References

Bibliography

External links
 One Hundred-Seventh Report on The Citizenship (Amendment) Bill, 2003,  Department-related Parliamentary Standing Committee on Home Affairs, 12 December 2003.
 Rajya Sabha – Official Report, Parliamentary Debates, Vol. 200, No. 13, 18 December 2003, see pages 381–389.
 Discussion on the Citizenship (Amendment) Bill, 2003, Lok Sabha Debates, 22 December 2003.
  Passport (Entry into India) Amendment Rules, 2015 and  Foreigners (Amendment) Order, 2015, The Gazette of India No. 553, 8 September 2015.

Immigration legislation
Illegal immigration to India
Immigration to India
Indian nationality law
Religious discrimination in India
Acts of the Parliament of India 2019